The Sellmeier equation is an empirical relationship between refractive index and wavelength for a particular transparent medium. The equation is used to determine the dispersion of light in the medium.

It was first proposed in 1872 by Wolfgang Sellmeier and was a development of the work of Augustin Cauchy on Cauchy's equation for modelling dispersion.

The equation
In its original and the most general form, the Sellmeier equation is given as
,
where n is the refractive index, λ is the wavelength, and Bi and Ci are experimentally determined Sellmeier coefficients. These coefficients are usually quoted for λ in micrometres. Note that this λ is the vacuum wavelength, not that in the material itself, which is λ/n. A different form of the equation is sometimes used for certain types of materials, e.g. crystals.

Each term of the sum representing an absorption resonance of strength Bi at a wavelength . For example, the coefficients for BK7 below correspond to two absorption resonances in the ultraviolet, and one in the mid-infrared region. Close to each absorption peak, the equation gives non-physical values of n2 = ±∞, and in these wavelength regions a more precise model of dispersion such as Helmholtz's must be used.

If all terms are specified for a material, at long wavelengths far from the absorption peaks the value of n tends to

where εr is the relative permittivity of the medium.

For characterization of glasses the equation consisting of three terms is commonly used:

As an example, the coefficients for a common borosilicate crown glass known as BK7 are shown below:

For common optical glasses, the refractive index calculated with the three-term Sellmeier equation deviates from the actual refractive index by less than 5×10−6 over the wavelengths' range of 365 nm to 2.3 μm, which is of the order of the homogeneity of a glass sample. Additional terms are sometimes added to make the calculation even more precise.

Sometimes the Sellmeier equation is used in two-term form:

Here the coefficient A is an approximation of the short-wavelength (e.g., ultraviolet) absorption contributions to the refractive index at longer wavelengths. Other variants of the Sellmeier equation exist that can account for a material's refractive index change due to temperature, pressure, and other parameters.

Coefficients

See also 
Cauchy's equation

References

External links
RefractiveIndex.INFO Refractive index database featuring Sellmeier coefficients for many hundreds of materials.
A browser-based calculator giving refractive index from Sellmeier coefficients.
Annalen der Physik - free Access, digitized by the French national library
Sellmeier coefficients for 356 glasses from Ohara, Hoya, and Schott

Optics
Equations